The University of Champagne (Université de Champagne) is the association of universities and higher education institutions (ComUE) combining higher education and research in the French region of Champagne-Ardenne.

The university was created as a ComUE according to the 2013 Law on Higher Education and Research (France), effective May 19, 2015. It replaced, in part, a previous grouping (PRES) known as  l'« Université fédérale européenne Champagne Ardenne Picardie ».

Members 
The University of Champagne brings together the following institutions :

 University of Reims Champagne-Ardenne,
 University of Technology of Troyes,
 Groupe École supérieure de commerce de Troyes,
 EPF - École d'ingénieurs,
 ESAD de Reims,
 Arts et Métiers ParisTech,
 Institut régional du travail social of Champagne-Ardenne .

Notes and references 

Universities in Grand Est
2015 establishments in France
Educational institutions established in 2015